Thermodesulforhabdus norvegica is a species of thermophilic sulfate-reducing bacteria, the type and only species of its genus. It is gram-negative, acetate-oxidizing, with type strain A8444.

References

Further reading
Whitman, William B., et al., eds. Bergey's manual® of systematic bacteriology. Vol. 3. Springer, 2012.

External links

LPSN
WORMS entry
Type strain of Thermodesulforhabdus norvegica at BacDive -  the Bacterial Diversity Metadatabase

Thermodesulfobacteriota
Thermophiles
Bacteria described in 1995